Parexarnis is a genus of moths of the family Noctuidae. Some authors consider it to be a subgenus of Actebia.

Species
 Parexarnis fugax (Treitschke, 1825)
 Parexarnis photophila (Guenée, 1852)
 Parexarnis sollers (Christoph, 1877)

References
Natural History Museum Lepidoptera genus database
Parexarnis at funet

Noctuinae